for the 2005 Japanese Film see Lorelei: The Witch of the Pacific Ocean

Lorelei is a 2020 American drama film written and directed by Sabrina Doyle in her feature debut. It stars Pablo Schreiber, Jena Malone, Amelia Borgerding, Parker Pascoe-Sheppard, Chancellor Perry and Martin Hernandez.

It had its world premiere at the Deauville American Film Festival on September 9, 2020. It was released on July 30, 2021, by Vertical Entertainment.

Cast
 Pablo Schreiber as Wayland
 Jena Malone as Dolores
 Amelia Borgerding as Periwinkle Blue
 Parker Pascoe-Sheppard as Denim Blue
 Chancellor Perry as Dodger Blue
 Gretchen Corbett as Kitty
 Dana Millican as Violet
 Martin Hernandez as Dodger's Friend
 Quinn Liebling as Dodger's Friend #2

Production
In February 2019, it was announced Pablo Schreiber and Jena Malone had joined the cast of the film, with Sabrina Doyle directing from a screenplay she wrote. Filming took place in and around Portland, Oregon.

Release
The film had its world premiere on September 9, 2020 at the Deauville American Film Festival, where a jury presided over by Vanessa Paradis awarded it the Jury Prize. It was previously set to have its world premiere at the Tribeca Film Festival in April 2020, but this was postponed due to the COVID-19 pandemic. The film subsequently got invited back to the 2021 Tribeca Film Festival, screening outdoors in Manhattan as part of the 20th anniversary edition of the festival. During its festival run, Lorelei also picked up Audience and Jury Awards at the International Filmfestival Mannheim-Heidelberg and the Jordan Ressler First Feature Award at the Miami International Film Festival. In March 2021, Vertical Entertainment acquired U.S. distribution rights to the film. It was released on July 30, 2021.

References

External links
 
 

2020 films
2020 directorial debut films
2020 drama films
American drama films
Films postponed due to the COVID-19 pandemic
Films scored by Jeff Russo
Films shot in Portland, Oregon
Vertical Entertainment films
2020s English-language films
2020s American films